Aldansky District (Aldan uluuha) is an administrative and municipal district (raion, or ulus), one of the thirty-four in the Sakha Republic, Russia.

Location
It is located in the south of the republic on the right bank of the Lena River near the mouth of the Aldan River and borders with Khangalassky and Amginsky Districts in the north, Ust-Maysky District in the northeast, Khabarovsk Krai in the east, Neryungrinsky District in the south, and with Olyokminsky District in the west and southwest.

Geography
Its area is larger than the country of Bangladesh. Its administrative center is the town of Aldan.

Population
As of the 2010 Census, the total population of the district was 42,632, with the population of Aldan accounting for 49.9% of that number.

Geography 
The landscape of the district is mostly mountainous, dominated mainly by the Aldan Highlands. The northern end of the district is in the Lena Plateau.

Climate

History
The district was established on May 5, 1930.

Administrative and municipal status
Within the framework of administrative divisions, Aldansky District is one of the thirty-four in the republic. It is divided into two towns (administrative divisions with the administrative centers in the towns (inhabited localities) of Aldan and Tommot), four settlements (administrative divisions with the administrative centers in the urban-type settlements (inhabited localities) of Bezymyanny, Lebediny, Leninsky, and Nizhny Kuranakh), and three rural okrugs (naslegs), all of which comprise thirteen rural localities. As a municipal division, the district is incorporated as Aldansky Municipal District. Within the municipal district, the Town of Aldan is incorporated into Aldan Urban Settlement, the Town of Tommot and the Settlement of Bezymyanny are incorporated into Tommot Urban Settlement, the Settlements of Lebediny and Leninsky are incorporated into Leninsky Urban Settlement, the Settlement of Nizhny Kuranakh is incorporated into Nizhny Kuranakh Urban Settlement, and the three rural okrugs are incorporated into three rural settlements. The town of Aldan serves as the administrative center of both the administrative and municipal district.

Inhabited localities

Economy 
The economy of the district is based mostly on mining, although the production of building materials, wood processing, and food industry also have presence. There are deposits of gold, silver, platinum, molybdenum, granite, marble, and other minerals in the district.

Demographics 
As of the 2002 Census, the ethnic composition was as follows:
Russians: 78.77%
Ukrainians: 5.50%
Evenks: 4.11%
Yakuts: 3.86%
Tatars: 1.29%
others: 6.47%

References

Notes

Sources
Official website of the Sakha Republic. Registry of the Administrative-Territorial Divisions of the Sakha Republic. Aldansky District. 

Districts of the Sakha Republic